Manuel Luis "Manolo" Casas Quezon III (born May 30, 1970) is a Filipino writer, former television host and a grandson of former Philippine president Manuel L. Quezon.

Quezon is a columnist and editorial writer for the Philippine Daily Inquirer. From 2007 to 2010, he was also the host and writer of The Explainer on the cable ABS-CBN News Channel. In 2003, he was named presidential assistant for historical affairs during the presidency of Gloria Macapagal Arroyo.

He was a history curator from March 2004 to March 2005 at the Ayala Museum. He served as spokesman for the committee in charge of the inauguration of President Benigno S. Aquino III. After the implementation of Executive Order No. 4, Aquino appointed Quezon as undersecretary of the Presidential Communications Development and Strategic Planning Office.

Quezon graduated from the University of the Philippines Diliman with a degree of Bachelor of Arts in political science.

Early life
Quezon was born in 1970, an adopted son of Manuel L. "Nonong" Quezon, Jr. (1926–1998) and wife, Lourdes "Lulu" Casas-Quezon. His father was the son of former president Manuel L. Quezon.

Filmography

TV show
The Explainer (2007–2010)

References

External links
Quezon.ph
The Long View column on Inquirer.net

1970 births
Filipino adoptees
Filipino columnists
Filipino television personalities
Members of the Presidential Communications Group of the Philippines
Living people
Manolo
University of the Philippines alumni
Benigno Aquino III administration cabinet members
ABS-CBN News and Current Affairs people
Philippine Daily Inquirer people
21st-century Filipino historians